JAGAL (Jamal-Gas-Anbindungsleitung) is a German section of the Yamal-Europe pipeline.  The pipeline is used for the Russian natural gas import and it is owned and operated by Gascade Gastransport GmbH.  It runs from the Polish–German border at Lebus near Frankfurt (Oder) to Rückersdorf. In Rückersdorf JAGAL is connected with STEGAL pipeline carrying gas further west.  In Bernau JAGAL is connected with the Verbundnetz Gas AG-operated long-distance gas pipeline No. 302.

This section was completed in 1996. The  second section of JAGAL from Mallnow to Baruth/Mark was completed in 1997. JAGAL II from Baruth to Rückersdorf was constructed in 1999.

See also

 MEGAL
 OPAL pipeline

References

External links
 JAGAL (Gascade website)

1999 establishments in Germany
Natural gas pipelines in Germany